Billie Jean King and Martina Navratilova were the defending champions but only Navratilova competed that year with Pam Shriver.

Navratilova and Shriver lost in the semifinals to Rosemary Casals and Wendy Turnbull.

Kathy Jordan and Anne Smith won in the final 6–3, 6–3 against Casals and Turnbull.

Seeds 
Champion seeds are indicated in bold text while text in italics indicates the round in which those seeds were eliminated.

Draw

Finals

Top half

Section 1

Section 2

Bottom half

Section 3

Section 4

External links 
1981 US Open – Women's draws and results at the International Tennis Federation

Women's Doubles
US Open (tennis) by year – Women's doubles
1981 in women's tennis
1981 in American women's sports